Vasiliy Vitalyevich Mizinov (born 29 December 1997) is a Russian racewalking athlete. He won a bronze medal in 20 kilometres race walk at the 2018 European Athletics Championships. Representing the Authorised Neutral Athletes at the 2019 World Athletics Championships, he won a silver medal in 20 kilometres walk. At the 2020 Summer Olympics, taking place in Tokyo, Japan in 2021, he was disqualified for going off-course.

References

External links

Russian male racewalkers
1997 births
Living people
Authorised Neutral Athletes at the World Athletics Championships
World Athletics Championships medalists
European Athletics Championships medalists
Athletes (track and field) at the 2020 Summer Olympics
Olympic athletes of Russia
People from Magnitogorsk
Sportspeople from Chelyabinsk Oblast